is a city located in Kyoto Prefecture, Japan. , the city had an estimated population of 31,082 in 13660 households and a population density of 90 persons per km².

Geography
Ayabe is situated in the mountains of Northern Kyoto Prefecture, with the  Yura River flowing through the center of the city.

Climate
Ayabe has a Humid subtropical climate (Köppen Cfa) characterized by warm summers and cool winters with light to no snowfall.  The average annual temperature in Ayabe is 13.5 °C. The average annual rainfall is 1639 mm with September as the wettest month. The temperatures are highest on average in August, at around 25.4 °C, and lowest in January, at around 2.3 °C.

Neighbouring municipalities 
 Kyoto Prefecture
 Maizuru
 Fukuchiyama
 Nantan
 Kyōtanba
 Fukui Prefecture
 Ōi
 Takahama

History
Ayabe is part of ancient Tanba Province. Per the Nihon Shoki and other historical sources, the area was settled during the Kofun period by the Hata clan, immigrants from mainland Asia who brought with the technology of sericulture and weaving. In the Heian period, the area was developed into a number of shōen landed estates by the Five regent houses in Kyoto. In the Sengoku period, the area came under the control of Akechi Mitsuhide , and in the Edo Period, it was the center of Ayabe Domain and the small Yamaga Domain. After the Meiji restoration, the town of Ayabe was established within Ikaruga District, Kyoto on April 1, 1889 with the creation of the modern municipalities system. It was raised to city status on August 1, 1950, and the city borders expanded in 1955 and 1956 to encompass all of former Ikaruga District.

Demographics
Per Japanese census data, the population of Ayabe has declined steadily over the past 60 years.

Government

Ayabe has a mayor-council form of government with a directly elected mayor and a unicameral city council of 18 members. Ayabe contributes one member to the Kyoto Prefectural Assembly. In terms of national politics, the city is part of the Kyoto 5th district of the lower house of the Diet of Japan.

Economy

Ayabe has a mixed economy of agriculture and light manufacturing, with several industrial parks in the city. The area was known from ancient times for weaving cloth, and the leading apparel manufacturer Gunze's registered headquarters are in Ayabe.
It is known for the founding of Ōmoto.

Education
Ayabe has ten public elementary schools and six public middle schools operated by the city government and one public high school operated by the Kyoto Prefectural Department of Education. Kyoto Prefectural Agricultural College has a campus in the city.

Transportation

Railways

Conventional lines
 JR West – San'in Main Line
 -  -  - 
 JR West – San'in Main Line
  -  -

Roads

Expressways
 Maizuru-Wakasa Expressway
 Kyoto Jūkan Expressway

Japan National Route

Twin towns and sister cities
 Changshu, China (Friendship city)
 Jerusalem, Israel (Friendship city)

References

External links 

  
 Ayabe city Tourism Guide 

Cities in Kyoto Prefecture
Ayabe, Kyoto